Rachel Mynfreda Sylvester (born 1969) is a British political journalist who writes for The Times.

Education and career
Sylvester was educated at South Hampstead High School, an independent school for girls in Hampstead in North West London, followed by Somerville College of the University of Oxford.

Sylvester joined The Daily Telegraph newspaper in 1992. In 1998, she left for a one-year period as the political editor of the Independent on Sunday newspaper. She returned to the Telegraph in 1999 as assistant editor (politics), a position she held until 2008.

Sylvester joined The Times newspaper in June 2008, where she writes a weekly political column and a weekly interview piece, often collaborating with Alice Thomson. She was named 2015's Political Journalist of the Year at the British Press Awards. Iain Martin has described her and Thomson's work as "highly skilled interviewers [with] a gift for getting people to burble on until they say something highly revealing." 

Sylvester wrote an interview with Conservative Party leadership candidate Andrea Leadsom during the 2016 leadership election in which Leadsom made comments with reference to her childless competitor Theresa May. Leadsom stood aside in the aftermath of the interview's release to allow May to become leader, which the Evening Standard said "confirmed Sylvester's status as one of the country's most influential political commentators". She was named 2016 Journalist of the Year by the Political Studies Association.

Sylvester presents the interview series Past Imperfect with Alice Thomson on Times Radio, which began in July 2020. Their first guests included Tony Blair and Sir Paul Nurse.

References

External links
 The Times
 Daily Telegraph

Audio clips
 Woman's Hour 15 April 2010
 Woman's Hour 19 November 2009
 Woman's Hour 23 April 2009
 Woman's Hour 29 June 2007

1969 births
Living people
Alumni of Somerville College, Oxford
British political journalists
British women journalists
The Daily Telegraph people
Place of birth missing (living people)
People educated at South Hampstead High School
The Independent people
The Times people
Rachel